Agim Zajmi (28 November 1936 – 3 November 2013) was an Albanian painter.  For his contribution to painting, he received the People's Artist of Albania medal.

 The most valued scenographer of the Albanian Theater (with over 300 scenographies)
 Distinguished Albanian painter (with about 800 artworks)
 Professor at the Academy of Arts in Tirana Albanian Academy of Belle Arts for 40 years
 President of the Nationwide Figurative Artists’ Association
 Recognitions and awards: People's Artist of Albania, Artist Emeritus, Professor

Studies and teaching career
Zajmi was born on 28 November 1936, in Tirana, Albania. He completed his studies in painting, scenography-costumography at The Imperial Arts Academy of Saint Petersburg and graduated in 1961. In the same year he commenced working as a scenographer at the Opera and Ballet Theater of Tirana and later on worked mainly at the Tirana National Theater. He also worked very frequently with the national theaters of Prishtina in Kosova, of Shkup in Macedonia and of Montenegro. Zajmi participated in several international festivals of theater as a stage designer and painter.

From 1978, until his death Zajmi was a professor at the Academy of Music and Arts of Albania in Tirana. He was a professor and dean of The Albanian Academy of Belle Arts in Tirana.

In 1978, upon request of the Albanian Arts Academy, he founded the scenography studies program and took the chair at The Albanian Academy of Belle Arts in Tirana, where hundreds of future scenographers would study and graduate. He taught there for the next 40 years.

Artworks 
His artwork has been exhibited in many countries such as France, United Kingdom, Italy, Germany, Austria, Turkey, Greece, Egypt, etc. Forty of his paintings and scenography are part of the Tirana National Art Gallery collection and collections in other countries as well. Some of his artwork is currently exhibited at the Building of the Prime Ministry of Albania.

National and international awards 
He is the winner of many national awards in painting and scenography. For his artistic excellence and merit, he has been awarded:
 Winner of KULT Award 2008 - Best Scenographer of the Year
 First Prize Award in Painting for Kosova Field artwork - 1989
 First Prize Award in Scenography for the General of the Dead Army theatrical scenography, Kragujevac Festival - Prishtina 1976
 First Prize Award in Scenography for the Eugène Ionesco Rhinoceros theatrical scenography, Rajsburg Biennale - Poland 1996
 Naim Frasheri Medal Award -1968
 Second Prize Award in Painting for Vasil Laçi Portrait artwork - 1972
 Second Prize Award in Painting for Ganimet Tërbesha Portrait artwork - 1981
 Second Prize Award in Painting for Ded Gjo Luli Composition artwork - 1984
 Aleksandër Moisiu Award - 1997
 Merited Artist of Albania - Awarded in 1975
 People's Artist of the Republic of Albania - Awarded in 1991
 In 1995 he is awarded the title Professor with the motivation for services rendered to the people of Albania by teaching and enriching the Albanian social life with young painters and scenographers
 Forty of his paintings and scenographies are part of the national fund of the Albanian National Art Gallery

His artistic-scientific creativity 
He is the writer and editor of the "Issues of Scenography and its Components", a chapter in Theoretical Basis of the Figurative Arts book which is a textbook for the students of the Tirana Academy of Belle Arts.

Lecturer of many artistic and scientific thesis such as "The Development of Albanian Art" at the University of Algiers and "The Artwork of the Albanian Painter Vangjush Mio" in Ankara, Turkey.

He is the president of the Nationwide Figurative Artists’ Association with headquarters in Tirana, Albania. The association cooperates with Albanian artists from all ethnic Albanian territories (Kosova, Macedonia, Montenegro and Greece) as well as the Albanian Diaspora.

National recognition 
The impact and repercussion of Zajmi's artwork and artistic activity has been reflected in various books, interviews and documentary films broadcast on both the national and private TV channels.

 “A voice in the microphone”, Radio Tirana, Guest Agim Zajmi, 30 minutes -1995
 “Blue - with Agim Zajmi”, Klan TV, 120 minutes - 2004
 “The Theater is My Home” by Arben Minga, Albanian Radio Television, 1 hour - 2005
 , Vizion+ TV, 30 minutes - November 2000
 , ALSAT TV, 1 hour - January 2008
 “Red Fish’s Escape” with Agim Zajmi, NEWS24 TV, 30 minutes - 2009
 “Agim Zajmi, the poet of scenography”, Monographic book by Kudret Velça. Biblio. P. 181-182 - L. 350 Tir.800. Classification 75 .054 .071.1(496.5)(092) 929(496.5) [Zajmi, Agim].

Further reading 

 “I am optimistic on the future” - interview with Agim Zajmi, Art and Culture Newspaper, 2000, Nr. 33, 13 December, P.5
 “I feel comfortable among the youth” - Interview with Agim Zajmi (Scenographer and painter), Gazeta 55 Newspaper, Nr. 8, 14 January 2005, P.16
 “We must be conductors of the epochs” - Interview with Agim Zajmi, journalist Admirina Peçi Tema Newspaper, Nr. 252, 22–23 April 2001 P. 16-17
 “The life and professional values of the father of many Albanian scenographies”, article on Agim Zajmi by Professor Kudret Velça and Kristaq Dhamo, Gazeta Shqiptare Newspaper, Nr. 1969, 5 September 2001, P.12-13.
 “The world will accept like artists when we will come like albanians”. Article on journal Bashkimi, Nr. 4516, P.6.
 “Agim Zajmi the poet of scenography”. Monograph, author Kundet Velça, redactor Adriatik Kallulli and Qirjako Meniko, "Maluka Editions", Tirana, 2000, 75.054.071.(496.5)(092)929(496.5)
 “Souvenirs from meetings of Agim Zajmi with the big albanian writer Azem Shkreli "Bashkimi" Newspaper, Number 15, 28 july 1997, p.3
 “Agim Zajmi, 50 creations, gift for Berat. And on the scenography of the Comedy “I need a husband” - Interview with the scenographer Agim Zajmi”, Shekulli Newspaper, Nr. 338, 8 December 2001, P. 21 by Admirina Peçi.
 “The exhibition, with the artist’s eye. Painter Agim Zajmi expresses his opinions on the Ceramics International Exhibition”, Dita Newspaper, Nr. 381, 14 March 2002, P.14, by Admirim Domi.
 “I am pleased with my life’s account” - on the 67th birthday anniversary of Scenographer Agim Zajmi, Dita Newspaper, Nr. 962, 29 November 2003, P.19.
 “Art is the ocean where anyone can swim : Painter Agim Zajmi narrates”, Koha Jone Newspaper, Nr. 358, 29 December 2003, P.21, by Baxhul Merkaj.
 “Zajmi, the man who gave breath to the stage : Agim Zajmi - Scenographer”, Dita Newspaper, Nr.1254, 20 September 2004, P.18 by Bexhul Merkaj and Albert Z. Zholi.
 “I believe in the younger generation” - interview of Dorina Azo with Agim Zajmi, Gazeta 55 Newspaper, Nr. 8, 14 January 2005, P.16.
 “A poor artwork is very tiring” - interview with Agim Zajmi, Dita Newspaper, Nr. 1351, 7 January 2005, P.19, by Anila Çuli.
 “Art teaches people how to view reality” - interview with the Scenographer and Painter Agim Zajmi, Sot Newspaper, 30 April 2006, P.18-19, by Genta Kondi.
 “Artistic works can be sold only in joy or grief moments ” - interview with the Scenographer and Painter Agim Zajmi, Korrieri, number 285, 14 october 2006, P.22, by Ymeri Anisa.
 “Kosova, the permanent motif of my paintings ” -  interview of Eralda Kenaj Gazeta 55 Newspaper, number 28, 1 february 2008, P.15.
 “An entire life searching the beauty ” -  interview of Najdeni-Bilbili, Bukurie Gazeta 55 Newspaper, number 59, 8 mars 2007, P.12.
 “Përcillet për në banesën e fundit piktori dhe skenografi Agim Zajmi”. Gazeta SHQIP. 2013-10-16. Retrieved 2013-11-08.

See also
 List of Albanian painters

References

External links
 

Albanian painters
1936 births
2013 deaths
People's Artists of Albania
Merited Artists of Albania
People from Tirana